Yookamurra Sanctuary is a 50 km2 private protected area in the Murraylands region of South Australia, between the eastern slopes of the Mount Lofty Ranges and the Murray River, 24 km north-east of the town of Sedan.  It is owned and managed by the Australian Wildlife Conservancy (AWC).

History
Yookamurra is a consolidation of several properties acquired by Earth Sanctuaries for wildlife conservation from the late 1980s to 1998, before being purchased by AWC in 2002.

Landscape and climate
The reserve consists of gently undulating country with shallow soils overlying calcrete, at an altitude of 80-90 m.  It lies at the southern end of the semi-arid zone of South Australia and the climate is one of cool winters and hot summers.  The average annual rainfall, mainly falling in winter, is 270 mm.

Ecosystems
Most of Yookamurra's habitats are variations of mallee woodlands and shrublands.

Fauna
Threatened fauna species include malleefowl, emu, southern hairy-nosed wombat, western grey kangaroo, red kangaroo, numbat, greater bilby, boodie, woylie and short-beaked echidna. An attempted reintroduction of the greater stick-nest rat failed.

References

External links
Official webpage
Webpage on the Protected Planet website

Private protected areas of South Australia
Australian Wildlife Conservancy reserves
1998 establishments in Australia